Agama hartmanni, Hartmann's agama, is a species of lizard in the family Agamidae. It is a small lizard found in South Sudan and Eritrea.

References

Agama (genus)
Reptiles described in 1869
Taxa named by Wilhelm Peters